The Bahr el Zeraf (also spelt Bahr az-Zaraf, Bahr ez Zeraf, and Baḩr az Zarāf), or Zeraf River in the English language, is an arm of the White Nile in the Sudd region of South Sudan. It is completely contained within the South Sudanese state of Jonglei. Its name is Arabic for "Giraffe River".

Course
The Bahr el Zeraf forms in the southern Sudd wetlands as an arm of the Bahr al Jabal ("Mountain Nile") section of the White Nile. These canals divert some of the Jabal's flow, more than doubling the Zeraf's volume, with the intention of accelerating the flow to Egypt and thereby reducing the water "lost" to evaporation and transpiration in the swamps.

About  of this distance is through continuous swamp with islands, transitioning further downstream to a well-defined channel with raised banks. The Zeraf rejoins the White Nile near New Fangak,  downriver from Lake No and  upriver from Malakal.

See also
List of rivers of South Sudan

References

External links
Bahr el Zeraf (river), Getty Thesaurus of Geographic Names
Baḩr az Zarāf,  GEOnet Names Server

Rivers of South Sudan
Nile basin
Jonglei State
Greater Upper Nile